Chien Yu-chin (born 24 October 1982) is a Taiwanese former badminton player.

Summer Olympics 
Chien competed for Chinese Taipei in the 2004 Olympics in the women's doubles with partner Cheng Wen-hsing. They defeated Helen Nichol and Charmaine Reid of Canada in the first round but were defeated by Hwang Yu-mi and Lee Hyo-jung of South Korea in the round of 16. At the 2008 Summer Olympics, again with Cheng, they lost to Wei Yili and Zhang Yawen of China in the quarter-finals. At the 2012 Summer Olympics, she teamed up with Cheng again, but they lost to Tian Qing and Zhao Yunlei, the eventual winners, in the quarterfinal.

Achievements

BWF World Championships 
Women's doubles

Mixed doubles

World Cup 
Women's doubles

Asian Championships 
Women's doubles

East Asian Games 
Women's doubles

Summer Universiade 
Women's doubles

World Junior Championships 
Girls' singles

BWF Superseries 
The BWF Superseries, which was launched on 14 December 2006 and implemented in 2007, is a series of elite badminton tournaments, sanctioned by the Badminton World Federation (BWF). BWF Superseries levels are Superseries and Superseries Premier. A season of Superseries consists of twelve tournaments around the world that have been introduced since 2011. Successful players are invited to the Superseries Finals, which are held at the end of each year.

Women's doubles

  BWF Superseries Finals tournament
  BWF Superseries Premier tournament
  BWF Superseries tournament

BWF Grand Prix 
The BWF Grand Prix had two levels, the BWF Grand Prix and Grand Prix Gold. It was a series of badminton tournaments sanctioned by the Badminton World Federation (BWF) which was held from 2007 to 2017. The World Badminton Grand Prix sanctioned by International Badminton Federation (IBF) from 1983 to 2006.

Women's doubles

Mixed doubles

  BWF Grand Prix Gold tournament
  BWF & IBF Grand Prix tournament

BWF International Challenge/Series/Satellite 
Women's singles

Women's doubles

Mixed doubles

  BWF International Challenge tournament
  BWF International Series/ Satellite tournament

Record against selected opponents 
Mixed doubles results with Lee Sheng-mu against Super Series finalists, World's semi-finalists, and Olympic quarterfinalists:

  He Hanbin & Yu Yang 0–1
  He Hanbin & Ma Jin 0–1
  Xu Chen & Ma Jin 1–1
  Tao Jiaming & Tian Qing 0–1
  Zhang Nan & Zhao Yunlei 0–3
  Zheng Bo & Ma Jin 0–1
  Chen Hung-ling & Cheng Wen-hsing 1–1
  Joachim Fischer Nielsen & Christinna Pedersen 0–3
  Michael Fuchs & Birgit Michels 0–2
  Tontowi Ahmad & Liliyana Natsir 0–1
  Fran Kurniawan & Pia Zebadiah Bernadet 1–1
  Ko Sung-hyun & Ha Jung-eun 0–2
  Lee Yong-dae & Lee Hyo-jung 1–0
  Chan Peng Soon & Goh Liu Ying 0–1
  Robert Mateusiak & Nadieżda Zięba 1–1
  Sudket Prapakamol & Saralee Thungthongkam 0–2

References

External links 

 
 
 

1982 births
Living people
Sportspeople from Kaohsiung
Taiwanese female badminton players
Badminton players at the 2004 Summer Olympics
Badminton players at the 2008 Summer Olympics
Badminton players at the 2012 Summer Olympics
Olympic badminton players of Taiwan
Badminton players at the 2002 Asian Games
Badminton players at the 2006 Asian Games
Badminton players at the 2010 Asian Games
Asian Games competitors for Chinese Taipei
Universiade gold medalists for Chinese Taipei
Universiade bronze medalists for Chinese Taipei
Universiade medalists in badminton
Medalists at the 2007 Summer Universiade
World No. 1 badminton players